A multi-question referendum was held in Taiwan on 24 November 2018 alongside local elections. The referendum was the first since the December 2017 reform to the Referendum Act, which reduced the threshold for submitting questions to the ballot; under the new system, signatures from 1.5 percent of the electorate (around 280,000 people) were required to successfully put a question on the ballot, reduced from 5 percent previously.

Background
A total of ten questions appeared on the ballot. Under Taiwanese law, for their initiative to be presented to the voters, a total of 280,000 signatures (1.5% of eligible voters) were required for a question to be considered by the Central Election Commission (CEC).  Five of the questions reviewed and approved by the CEC were about LGBT rights, LGBT sex education and same-sex marriage. Four other questions on the ballot concerned international games representation, nuclear power, coal power and a ban on imports of agricultural products and food from areas affected by the Fukushima nuclear disaster. The tenth question asked voters to reject Article 95-1 of the Electricity Act, which stipulated that all of the country's nuclear power generating facilities should be decommissioned by 2025. This question had originally been rejected by the CEC, though the commission reversed its decision after being ordered by the Taipei High Administrative Court to accept an additional 24,000 signatures added to the petition.

For a proposal to be approved, at least 25 percent of the eligible voters had to vote in favour of the question.

Same-sex marriage proposals
In February 2018, a Taiwanese conservative Christian group opposed to same-sex marriage (the Alliance for Next Generation's Happiness) proposed holding a referendum on the issue, aiming to overturn a May 2017 ruling by the Constitutional Court that mandated the legalisation of same-sex marriage in Taiwan within two years. The Central Election Commission reviewed and accepted the group's proposals in April 2018. Two of their approved questions were related to same-sex marriage; one on whether marriage should be limited to a bond between a man and a woman and one on whether there should be a special law to protect same-sex couples' right to a "permanent union" (effectively introducing civil unions). A third question will ask voters whether to prevent the implementation of laws mandating the inclusion of information about homosexuality in sexual education classes at schools.
 
In September 2018, a group in favor of same-sex marriage announced that it had collected enough signatures to submit its own questions to a referendum. The group's questions would require the legislature to amend the Civil Code to expressly allow same-sex couples to marry and also mandated the inclusion of gender diversity in sex education.

Olympics name proposal
The Olympics question proved controversial. While the name Chinese Taipei is seen by many Taiwanese as confusing and even offensive, many voters and athletes worried that insisting on competing under the name Taiwan would lead to the total exclusion of Taiwanese athletes from the Olympics. The proposal was rejected by 54.80% of voters.

Questions and results
The ten questions that appeared on the ballot and final results were:

Results

References

External links
Equal Love Taiwan

2018 referendums
Referendum
2018
Taiwan,2018
Taiwan,2018
Taiwan,2018
Referendum,2018
Referendum,2018
Referendum,2018
Referendum,2018
2018 in LGBT history